The Nieuport-Delage NiD 540 was a high wing, eight seat, single engine airliner, built in France and first flown in 1930. It did not reach production.

Design and development

The Nieuport-Delage NiD 540 was an all-metal aircraft. It had a two part, high, cantilever wing; each half-wing was trapezoidal in plan with blunted tips and which tapered uniformly outwards in thickness from below, providing some dihedral. The half-wings were linked by a centre-section built into and the same width as the upper fuselage. High aspect ratio ailerons filled most of the trailing edges. Structurally the half-wings were in three parts, a spanwise box and separate leading and trailing edges, all covered in Duralumin.

The NiD 540's engine was in the nose. Its first flight, made early in 1930 by Lasne, was powered by a  Renault 12Ki  V-12 engine, identifiable by a short, upright exhaust stub, geared down and driving a three blade propeller. By the time of the Paris Salon exhibition in November 1930 it had a  Lorraine 12Fad Courlis W-12 engine with a two blade propeller and from April 1931 a  Lorraine Petrel V12.

Behind the engine, the fuselage, rectangular in section apart from a curved roof, was in two parts.  The central section, which mounted the wing and held both crew and passengers, was built from riveted frames and was metal skinned, with a corrugated floor. The enclosed and multi-panel glazed cockpit had side-by-side seating with dual control and was just forward of the wing leading edge.  The NiD 540's passenger cabin seated eight, each with their own large window, and was entered by a portside door at its rear. The rear section of the fuselage began immediately behind the door and was constructed from four longerons, tapering to the tail and fabric covered.

The NiD 540 had an angular empennage, with its straight-tapered tailplane mounted on top of the fuselage carrying narrow elevators. The square-topped fin had a more generous rudder hinged behind the elevators. Earlier, unbuilt designs of the NiD 540 were shown with curved tail shapes.

The landing gear was fixed and conventional, with each mainwheel, fitted with brakes,  on a hinged faired V-strut from the side of the fuselage. A tall, faired landing leg with a Messier shock absorber was attached to the wing root. Its tailwheel also had a shock absorber.

There were several design studies of variants but the only one which may have been completed was the NiD 541. Rosenthal suggests it was and had a  Lorraine 14Ae Antarès fourteen cylinder radial engine. Flight, on the other hand, associates this name with the Courlis-engined example on display at the 1930 Salon. Les Ailes makes it clear that the Courlis and the Antares were options in 1930.  No images of the radial-engined variant seem to have survived.

Rather little is known of the activities of the NiD 540 after its first flight apart from the various engine changes. A period of official evaluation of these continued until May 1933.  It remained active until at least 1935, when it took part in October in the annual tour of French prototypes organised by the French Aeronautical Federation.

Variants
NiD 540
NiD 541A single example probably built or converted, powered by either a  Lorraine 14Ae Antarès fourteen cylinder radial engine, or a  Lorraine 12Fad Courlis W-12 engine.

Specifications (Lorraine 12F Courlis engine)

See also

References

External links

1930s French airliners
 0540
Single-engined tractor aircraft
High-wing aircraft
Aircraft first flown in 1930